Willie or Willy Wright may refer to:

 Willie Wright (musician) (1939–2020), American soul singer and songwriter
 Willie Wright (American football, born 1968), American football linebacker and tight end
 Willie Wright (American football, born 1996), American football offensive lineman
 Willie Anne Wright (born 1924), American photographer
 Willy Wright (1917–2010), British civil servant and geologist

See also
William Wright (disambiguation)